WUCU-LD, virtual and UHF digital channel 33, was a low-powered Azteca America-affiliated television station licensed to Evansville, Indiana, United States. The station was owned by HC2 Holdings.

History 
The station's construction permit was issued on February 5, 2010 under the calls of W33CU-D which was changed to WUCU-LD.

On December 16, 2020, the FCC, at the request of DTV America, cancelled the license of the station after it had been on the air for only a few months. The license of sister station W27DH-D (channel 27) was cancelled at the same time.

Digital channels

References

External links

Low-power television stations in the United States
Innovate Corp.
Television stations in Indiana
Television channels and stations established in 2019
Television channels and stations disestablished in 2020
2019 establishments in Indiana
2020 disestablishments in Indiana